Witchcraft is a horror film series, that as of March 2018, has 16 direct to video installments, making it one of the horror genre's longest-running interconnected series. It began in 1988, and most films focus, at least partially, on the character of William Spanner, who is a powerful warlock who fights for good despite having an evil lineage.

Setting

Mythology

The series begins when Grace Churchill discovers her husband and mother-in-law's plan to use her newborn child, William, as a means to bring about the end of the world. The husband and mother-in-law are evil witches, who worship Satan. While Grace prevents this from happening, it is thought that only William and his mother  survives the first film. In the second movie, 18 year old William, unaware of his heritage, and having been adopted by the Adams family, finds that his next door neighbor, the witch who survived from the first film, attempts to seduce him to use his powers for darkness. The Adams are white witches who had rejected the evil of the coven from the first film and stole William away.

Spanner resists the temptation, and in between the second and third movie, becomes a lawyer, getting a job in the district attorney's office. After being fired from the district attorney's office (a move which later movies reveal was caused by his black magic roots being discovered) he opens his own law office. Spanner resists his heritage, preferring a normal life, but events conspire to force him to use his powers, often with the fate of the world at stake. Spanner later becomes more comfortable with his powers and his role in protecting the world against the dark powers. Beginning in Witchcraft VI, Spanner often serves as an unofficial consultant for the Los Angeles Police Department, usually working with Detective Lutz and/or Garner.

While Spanner is the main character of the series, he is not in movies 8 and 10, and is only an infant in the first film. He dies at the end of the seventh movie, and remains dead during the eighth movie, but is resurrected in the ninth movie. He does not appear during the tenth movie, which is set in London, England and follows Lt. Lutz as she assist Interpol with a case, although he is referenced.

Keli is Spanner's Girlfriend in many of the movies, and they are engaged sometime between the tenth and the eleventh movie, but she disappears and is not referred to after the 11th movie.

The 14th–16th movies form a connected trilogy. The 16th film takes place in the "real" world, pokes fun of the film series recasting of the leads and the low budget nature of the series, using the actors from the 14th and 15th movie. The 16th movie explains that the entire series, and its oft recasting of the leads, is part of a careful plot by Satan to control the world.

Films

Cast and crew

Principal cast
List indicator(s)
 A dark grey cell indicates the character was not in the film.

Crew

Production

Development

All movies have been produced by Vista Street Entertainment. Troma Studios released films 1–9. The series maintains an official YouTube channel with behind the scenes information  and a Facebook page.

Reception
Despite its longevity, the series is not well regarded, and the AV Club notes that the series "Witchcraft continually relies on the same stock story lines, most often involving a good warlock struggling against trashy temptresses sent by evil warlocks to seduce him to the dark side." Crave's series project states the series is "trashy .... straight-to-video schlock " and finds little use for the series other than as "notorious video store staples". "The first four movies had the pretense of a supernatural plot and an interconnected mythology, but after that, the series began to slump (or improve, depending on your point of view) in to blatant softcore pornography.

In Creature Feature, a review of the first six movies found much of the same, with the third movie being the best of the first six.

TV Guide states "It's hard to fathom why this cheap-looking, uninspired series has run so long. Perhaps video store buyers and their customers figure that any series with this many installments has to have something going for it. But they'd be wrong." In many of the movies in the series the acting is quite poor by reasonable standards, with the actors sometimes even stumbling over their lines. The sex scenes are often unrealistic and extremely - laughably - fake looking (intercourse movements will be taking place in scenes but in numerous shots you can plainly see the male actor wearing underwear and his genitals well over a foot away from those of the female).

Video Reviewer 22 Shots found that the first 4 movies has a small amount of low budget, cheesy charm, the rest of the series " went more exploitative and sleazy" and were only recommended for fans of ultra-low budget films.

References

Film series introduced in 1988
Horror film series
Films about witchcraft
American erotic horror films